In enzymology, a glycine transaminase is an enzyme that catalyzes the chemical reaction

glycine + 2-oxoglutarate  glyoxylate + L-glutamate

Thus, the two substrates of this enzyme are glycine and 2-oxoglutarate, whereas its two products are glyoxylate and L-glutamate.

This reactions strongly favours synthesis of glycine. This enzyme belongs to the family of transferases, specifically the transaminases, which transfer nitrogenous groups.  The systematic name of this enzyme class is glycine:2-oxoglutarate aminotransferase. Other names in common use include glutamic-glyoxylic transaminase, glycine aminotransferase, glyoxylate-glutamic transaminase, L-glutamate:glyoxylate aminotransferase, and glyoxylate-glutamate aminotransferase.  This enzyme participates in glycine, serine and threonine metabolism.  It employs one cofactor, pyridoxal phosphate.

References

 
 

EC 2.6.1
Pyridoxal phosphate enzymes
Enzymes of unknown structure